Oedemasia is a genus of prominent moths in the family Notodontidae. There are at least four described species in Oedemasia, found mainly in North America.

Species
These four species belong to the genus Oedemasia:
 Oedemasia concinna (J. E. Smith, 1797) (red-humped caterpillar)
 Oedemasia leptinoides (Grote, 1864) (black-blotched schizura)
 Oedemasia salicis (Edwards, 1877)
 Oedemasia semirufescens (Walker, 1865) (red-washed prominent)

References

Notodontidae